Coral Edge LRT station is an elevated Light Rail Transit (LRT) station on the Punggol LRT line East Loop in Punggol, Singapore. It was opened on 29 January 2005 together with the Sengkang LRT West Loop. The station is located near Punggol Plaza and Punggol 21 Community Club along Punggol Field between the junctions of Edgedale Plains and Punggol Field Walk.

Etymology

The name is taken from the Punggol Coral Residents' Committee (RC), which manages a cluster of HDB flats near the station.

Incidents
On 9 January 2020, at around 2.15pm, a crack was spotted on one of the elevated concrete slabs — known as plinths — on which the LRT's light rail vehicles run. The “isolated” crack was located between the Riviera and Coral Edge stations. One platform has been closed early from 9pm to 4am for urgent maintenance, while operations continue as trains run on other platforms.

References

Railway stations in Singapore opened in 2005
Punggol
LRT stations in Punggol
Railway stations in Punggol
Light Rail Transit (Singapore) stations